The Dyfed Archaeological Trust is one of the four Welsh Archaeological Trusts established in the mid-1970s with the charitable object 'to advance the education of the public in archaeology'. Its core area comprises Carmarthenshire, Ceredigion and Pembrokeshire (the old county of Dyfed) in south-west Wales.

The Trust provides archaeological and related advice to central government, local planning authorities and other public and private organisations. It maintains the regional Historic Environment Record. The Welsh Archaeological Trusts were pioneers in developing Historic Environment Records (HERs) in the 1970s: Wales was the first part of the UK to develop a fully national system of what were then called ‘Sites and Monuments Records’; this fully computerised system was pioneered by the Dyfed Archaeological Trust Chief Executive, Don Benson.

Data included in the Historic Environment Record are publicly available on a dedicated website, Archwilio. The Trust also undertakes a wide range of field- and office-based projects, is a limited company and a registered charity.

Notable people 

 W. F. Grimes, Chair of the Trust 1975-1988
 Ken Murphy, Director of the Trust since 2007
 Christopher R. Musson, Chair of the Trust 1989-1991 and 2005-2010

See also

Clwyd-Powys Archaeological Trust
Glamorgan-Gwent Archaeological Trust
Gwynedd Archaeological Trust 
Cadw
Royal Commission on the Ancient and Historical Monuments of Wales
Welsh Archaeological Trusts

References

External links
Dyfed Archaeological Trust Website
Archwilio website

Archaeology of Wales
Archaeological organizations
Organisations based in Carmarthenshire